Mandello may refer to:

Places
 Mandello del Lario, a town on Lake Como in Lombardy, Italy
 Mandello Vitta, a village in the Province of Novara in the region Piedmont, Italy

People with the surname
 Jeanne Mandello (1907–2001), German modern artist and experimental photographer

See also
 Mandell, a surname